Ben Judah (born 1988) is a British journalist and the author of This Is London and Fragile Empire.

Early life
The son of author Tim Judah and Rosie Whitehouse, he was born in London. He is of Baghdadi Jewish descent. He spent a portion of his childhood in the Balkans before returning to London where he was educated at the Lycée Français Charles de Gaulle. He attended  the University of Oxford.

Career

Judah has interviewed and profiled French President Emmanuel Macron, Pakistani Prime Minister Imran Khan and UK Chancellor Rishi Sunak. He has covered the 2008 Russo-Georgian War, the 2010 Kyrgyz Revolution and the 2011 Tunisian Revolution. He was a regular contributor to the magazine Standpoint, reporting from the Caucasus, Siberia, Central Asia and Xinjiang. 

From 2010 to 2012, he was a policy fellow in London at the European Council on Foreign Relations, a think-tank. He has also been a visiting fellow at the European Stability Initiative in Istanbul. From 2017 to 2020, he was a research fellow at the Hudson Institute in Washington D.C. In 2020, he joined the Atlantic Council in Washington D.C. as a Nonresident Senior Fellow. Judah has written for various progressive and conservative think-tanks including The Center For American Progress (CAP) and Policy Exchange. His work has also featured at The German Council on Foreign Relations.

His first book, Fragile Empire (2013), a study of Vladimir Putin's Russia, was published by Yale University Press. His second book, This Is London,  was published by Picador in 2016. The book was longlisted for the Baillie Gifford Prize for Non-fiction 2016 and shortlisted for the Ryszard Kapuscinski Award for Literary Reportage 2019.

Judah has written for The New York Times and The Sunday Times. He has been a guest on CNN, BBC News and Channel 4 News and is a contributing writer for Politico Europe.

In 2015, he was commended for the Feature Writer of the Year award at the British Press Awards.

Judah's name appeared on the Forbes 30 under 30 Europe list in 2016.

Personal life 
Judah is married to BuzzFeed News reporter Rosie Gray.

Bibliography

Books

Selected articles

References

1988 births
Living people
21st-century British journalists
21st-century British writers
Alumni of the University of Oxford
British Jews
British journalists
British people of Iraqi-Jewish descent
Writers about Russia
Writers from London